Denis Valerievich Bogdan (born 13 October 1996) is a Belarusian-born Russian volleyball player, a member of the Russian  men's national volleyball team.

Sporting achievements

Clubs
 CEV Challenge Cup
  2015/2016 – with Fakel Novy Urengoy
  2016/2017 – with Fakel Novy Urengoy

 National championships
 2021/2022  Russian Championship, with Dynamo Moscow
 2021/2022  Russian Super Cup, with Dynamo Moscow

References

1996 births
Living people
Russian men's volleyball players
Olympic volleyball players of Russia
Volleyball players at the 2020 Summer Olympics
Sportspeople from Grodno
Universiade medalists in volleyball
Universiade bronze medalists for Russia
Medalists at the 2019 Summer Universiade
Medalists at the 2020 Summer Olympics
Olympic silver medalists for the Russian Olympic Committee athletes
Olympic medalists in volleyball